Ken "Mouse" McFadden is a former basketball player. He attended Seward Park High School in New York. He played at Cleveland State University from 1985–1989. He helped lead Cleveland State to three postseason appearances and a trip to the Sweet Sixteen. His number 10 is one of only three numbers to have been retired by Cleveland State. He scored 2,256 points for the Vikings from 1985 to 1989, which is still the Cleveland State record for career points scored. He finished his college career as the all-time leading scorer in Mid-Continent Conference history.  He also played in the CBA and USBL. He then went to work for Cleveland State's athletic department before being fired for accusing associate athletic director Chris Sedlock of writing numerous papers for basketball players.

References

External links
http://sportsillustrated.cnn.com/basketball/college/news/2001/01/24/mailbag/
http://www.usatoday.com/sports/college/mensbasketball/2004-11-04-roundup_x.htm
https://web.archive.org/web/20050211140354/http://i.tsn.com/archives/ncaa/mcfadden.html
https://www.nytimes.com/1987/12/13/sports/college-basketball-cleveland-state-can-t-stop-fdu.html
http://clevelandsportshall.com/mcfadden-ken-mouse/

Living people
American expatriate basketball people in Australia
American men's basketball players
Cleveland State Vikings men's basketball players
Point guards
Seward Park High School alumni
Year of birth missing (living people)